Christian Reimann (born 28 November 1979) is a retired German footballer who played as a striker.

Career
Born in Stadtroda, Thuringia, Reinmann made his professional debut in the German 3. Liga against 1. FC Heidenheim on 24 July 2010.

Honours
 Topscorer Oberliga NOFV-Süd 2006–07 with 20 Goals

References

1979 births
Living people
People from Stadtroda
Footballers from Thuringia
German footballers
FC Carl Zeiss Jena players
FC Sachsen Leipzig players
Association football forwards
VFC Plauen players
1. FC Magdeburg players
RB Leipzig players
VfB Pößneck players
3. Liga players